Somnambulist or The Somnambulist can refer to:

 a person who engages in somnambulism (sleepwalking)
 a term used in hypnosis to indicate someone of high enough suggestibility to follow suggestions without the need for a formal trance

Books
The Somnambulist, a novel by Jonathan Barnes (author)
 The title character in Don't Wake Up the Sleepwalker, a novel by Stefan Kisyov
 A zombie, as used in the novels The Zombie Survival Guide and World War Z

Film and TV
 "Somnambulist" (Angel), a 2000 episode of the TV show Angel
 A central character by the name of Cesare, from the 1920 German silent horror film The Cabinet of Dr. Caligari

Music
 Somnambulist (album), an album by American metal band Sicmonic
 Somnambulist, album by rock band Abandoned Pools

Songs
 "The Somnambulist", song by English rock band XTC 1979
 "The Fleeing Somnambulist", by Christian Death, written by Rozz Williams 1998
 "Somnambulist (Simply Being Loved)", a song by BT
 "Somnambulist", song by the Swedish artist Psilodump
 "Somnambulist", song by Australian rock band Blueline Medic
 "Somnambulist",  song by DJ performance artist/producer/musician Mount Sims from The Album Wild Light
 "Like a Somnambulist in Daylight's Fire", a song by the German Black-metal band Dark Fortress
 "Somnambulist", a song by the EBM/Industrial band Suicide Commando